The Roman Catholic Diocese of Franceville is a diocese located in the city of Franceville in the Ecclesiastical province of Libreville in Gabon.

History
 5 October 1974: Established as Diocese of Franceville from the Diocese of Mouila

Bishops of Franceville
 Félicien-Patrice Makouaka (5 October 1974 – 8 November 1996)
 Timothée Modibo-Nzockena (8 November 1996 – 4 November 2017)
 Jean-Patrick Iba-Ba (4 November 2017 – 12 March 2020)
 Ephrem Ndjoni (25 July 2022  – present) bishop elect

See also
Roman Catholicism in Gabon

References

External links
 GCatholic.org
 Catholic Hierarchy

Roman Catholic dioceses in Gabon
Christian organizations established in 1974
Roman Catholic dioceses and prelatures established in the 20th century
Roman Catholic Ecclesiastical Province of Libreville